A "Black Lives Matter" street mural was painted in Seattle, in the U.S. state of Washington in June 2020.

The text "Black Lives Matter" was first painted in large white letters on Pine Street between 10th and 11th avenues, during the Capitol Hill Occupied Protest. After the letters began to deteriorate, the mural was etched permanently into the road surface in September and repainted with colorful, block letters, each contributed by a different artist.

The "E" in "matter" featured representations of graffiti seen around the city, and its artist was criticised for having included the anti-police slogan ACAB, apparently without notifying other artists.

Mural artists include Takiyah Ward and Kimisha Turner.

The mural is maintained by the Seattle Department of Transportation. To protect the pedestrian area, slower traffic lanes came to displace East Pine Street's curb parking. The work was refreshed in July 2022 and will require periodic maintenance over time.

See also

 2020 in art

References

2020 establishments in Washington (state)
2020 paintings
Black Lives Matter art
Capitol Hill, Seattle
2020s murals
Murals in Washington (state)
African-American history in Seattle